Tasmanian Devil: Munching Madness is a video game developed by the British studio M4 Ltd. and released by Sunsoft in 1999 for the Game Boy Color. The game stars the Looney Tunes character Tasmanian Devil.

Gameplay
The game is a platform game played from an overhead perspective. Players take control of Taz to eat all the food in each of the nine levels - Tasmania, Australia, China, Greece, Switzerland, Amsterdam, Amazon River, Las Vegas and Transylvania. On the way, players must also collect medallions and attack enemies by using Taz's signature spin or by spitting.

References

1999 video games
Cartoon Network video games
Game Boy Color games
Game Boy Color-only games
Platform games
Single-player video games
Sunsoft games
Video games developed in the United Kingdom
Video games featuring the Tasmanian Devil (Looney Tunes)